Ljubač may refer to:

 Ljubač, Zadar County, a village near Ražanac, Croatia
 Ljubač, Šibenik-Knin County, a village near Knin, Croatia
 Ljubač, Dubrovnik-Neretva County, a village near Dubrovnik, Croatia